David Darling (March 4, 1941 – January 8, 2021) was an American cellist and composer. In 2010, he won the Grammy Award for Best New Age Album. He performed and recorded with Bobby McFerrin, Paul Winter Consort, Ralph Towner and Spyro Gyra and released many solo albums. Among these were 15 recordings for ECM.

Music career
Darling was born on March 4, 1941, in Elkhart, Indiana. He was interested in music from an early age, beginning piano when he was four, cello at ten, and string bass in high school. He studied classical cello at Indiana State University and after graduating remained there another four years as a teacher.

He worked as a studio musician in Nashville, Tennessee and was a member of the Paul Winter Consort until 1978. During the following year, he was part of the chamber jazz group Gallery with Ralph Towner and released his first solo album, Journal October.

Darling's performance and composition draw on a wide range of styles, including classical, jazz, Brazilian, African, and Indian music.

He wrote and performed music for more than a dozen major motion pictures, the horror film Child's Play (1988), Heat (1995), and Until the End of the World (1991). He contributed music to Nouvelle Vague (1990), Éloge de l'amour (2001), and Notre musique (2004).

In 2000, he recorded a collaboration with the Wulu Bunun, a group of Taiwanese aborigines.

In 2007 he recorded The Darling Conversations, with Julie Weber discussing his music philosophy. It was issued by Manifest Spirit Records. In January 2009, Darling released the Grammy-winning Prayer for Compassion, a follow-up of his earlier 8-String Religion, both on the Curve Blue label.

Other activities
In 1986, Darling joined Young Audiences, an organization that seeks to educate children about music and the arts through school programs. In the same year, he founded Music for People, which seeks to encourage self-expression through musical improvisation. His teaching methods are the subject of a book, Return to Child (2008).

In May 2008, he became part of a collaboration of music teacher and performers offering a training program in holistic and intercultural approaches to healing with sound and music at the New York Open Center Sound and Music School.
David Darling died in his sleep, January 8, 2021.

Awards and honors
 Grammy Award, Best New Age Album, Prayer for Compassion, 2010

Discography

As leader
 Journal October (ECM, 1979)
 Cycles (ECM, 1981)
 Cello (ECM, 1992)
 Dark Wood, (ECM, 1993)
 Eight String Religion, (Curve Blue,1993)
 The Tao of Cello (Relaxation, 1993)
 Musical Massage: Balance (Relaxation, 2000)
 Cello Blue, (Hearts of Space/Valley Entertainment, 2001)
 Musical Massage: In Tune (Relaxation, 2001)
 River Notes, (Curve Blue, 2002)
 Open Window (Relaxation, 2003)
 Mudanin (Kata World Music Network/Riverboat, 2004)
 Balance (Gaiam, 2006)
 Musical Massage: Blissful Relaxation (Relaxation, 2007)
 The Darling Conversations, Vol. 1 (Manifest Spirit, 2007)
 Prayer for Compassion (Curve Blue, 2009)
 Where Did the Time Go (CD Baby, 2013)
 Gratitude (Curve Blue, 2016)
 Homage to Kindness (2019)

As sideman
With Peter Kater
 Homage, 1989
 Migration, 1992

With Ketil Bjørnstad
 The Sea (ECM, 1994)
 The River (ECM, 1996)
 The Sea II (ECM, 2000)
 Epigraphs (ECM, 2000)

With Terje Rypdal
 Eos (ECM, 1984)
 Skywards (ECM, 1995)

With Jacqueline Tschabold Bhuyan
 Cello & Piano Meditations (Sounds True, 2012)
 Improvisations for Cello & Piano (CD Baby, 2012)

With others
 Introducing Glen Moore, Glen Moore (Elektra, 1979) 
 Old Friends, New Friends, Ralph Towner (ECM, 1979)
 Amber, Michael Jones, 1987 
 Until the End of the World 1991
 Window Steps, Pierre Favre, With Kenny Wheeler, and Steve Swallow (ECM, 1996)
 Pendulum, with Kevin Keller, 1999
 96 Years, with Patrick Leonard, 2000
 Refuge, with Terry Tempest Williams, ( Curve Blue, 2002)
 Into the Deep: America, Whaling & the World, 2010)
 Return of DeSire: Improvisations, with Eve Kodiak (CD Baby, 2008)
 Tympanum, with Jane Buttars, 2013
 "Where Did The Time Go" with Neil Tatar 2013 
 In Love and Longing, with Silvia Nakkach, (Sounds True, 2014)

See also 
List of ambient music artists

References

External links
 Official site
 The Darling Conversations, music philosophy 
 Musicolog
 
 

1941 births
2021 deaths
People from Elkhart, Indiana
20th-century classical composers
21st-century classical composers
American classical cellists
American male classical composers
American classical composers
ECM Records artists
Indiana State University alumni
Musicians from Indiana
Western Kentucky University faculty
21st-century American composers
20th-century American composers
20th-century American male musicians
21st-century American male musicians
Paul Winter Consort members
American jazz cellists
20th-century cellists
21st-century cellists